Audubon Avenue is an avenue in the Washington Heights neighborhood in Upper Manhattan that runs north-south, west of and parallel to Amsterdam Avenue. Its southern terminus is at West 165th Street and St. Nicholas Avenue, and its northern terminus is at Fort George Avenue, just north of West 193rd Street. It crosses over the Trans-Manhattan Expressway, east of the eastern portal of the expressway's tunnel.

History 
Audubon Avenue is named for naturalist John James Audubon, who owned a farm in the area. The Fort George Amusement Park, now a seating area in Highbridge Park, was located at the northern end of Audubon Avenue from 1895 to 1914.

References

External links
Audubon Avenue on Google Maps

Streets in Manhattan